Milan Radonjić, better known as Milan Tarot, born on 11 April 1973, is a known TV personality, comedian, satirist and tarot card reader in the Balkan region.

At first, after finishing high school, Radonjić worked late-night tarot shows on local TV stations in Serbia such as TV Duga and TV Palma Plus. His shows gained considerable mainstream interest, including single and multiple page interviews in Jutarnji list, Večernji list and Blic, after a series of video clips with Radonjić's bizarre predictions and advice, such as "You will get pregnant in seven days if you read Pinocchio every day.", emerged on the Internet. Also things like yelling "Ninja! Ninja! Ninja! Ninja! Ninja!" will cure diseases.

Consequently, and especially after Serbian law prohibited TV card readings, he started working at five television stations in Bosnia and Herzegovina, including nationwide OBN television based in Sarajevo, and a number of television stations in Croatia, including nationwide Nova TV based in Zagreb, first appeared on the show Nightmare Stage by Željko Malnar on Z1 TV. Allegedly, his contract with OBN TV is worth 780 thousand US dollars, but that, like most things Radonjić publicly claims, is doubtful.

In his usual half-joking, half-serious style, Radonjić claims that his shows are adapted for year 2017 and therefore only 15 percent of the people understand him. He also stated he has bought YouTube and that Barack Obama and Bill Gates have consulted him for advice.

References 

Serbian television personalities
Living people
1973 births
Television people from Belgrade